The 2018 United States Senate election in Pennsylvania took place on November 6, 2018, to elect a member of the United States Senate to represent the State of Pennsylvania, concurrently with other elections to the United States Senate, elections to the United States House of Representatives, and various state and local elections. The primary elections were held on May 15. Incumbent Democratic Senator Bob Casey Jr. ran for re-election to a third term. Casey, who faced no primary opposition, defeated the Republican nominee, Lou Barletta, Green Party nominee Neal Gale, and Libertarian Party nominee Dale Kerns. Casey was the first senator who was elected to a third term from Pennsylvania since Arlen Specter in 1992, and the first Pennsylvania Democrat to be popularly elected to three terms in the Senate.

Democratic primary

Candidates

On ballot
 Bob Casey Jr., incumbent U.S. Senator

Results

Republican primary

Candidates

On ballot
 Lou Barletta, U.S. Representative from Hazleton
 Jim Christiana, State Representative from Beaver

Withdrew
 Paul Addis, businessman (running for PA-5)
 Cynthia E. Ayers, cyber security consultant and former National Security Agency employee
 Paul DeLong, candidate for the U.S. Senate in 2004
 Bobby Lawrence, small business owner (endorsed Dale Kerns)
 Andrew Shecktor, Berwick Borough Councilman (running for PA-9)
 Rick Saccone, state representative (ran for PA-18, ran for PA-14)
 Jeff Bartos, real estate developer (running for lieutenant governor)

Declined
 Mike Kelly, U.S. Representative
 Pat Meehan, former U.S. Representative
 Dave Reed, Majority Leader of the Pennsylvania House of Representatives

Endorsements

Polling

Results

Libertarian Party
Dale Kerns ran unopposed for the Libertarian nomination and received the official nomination from the Pennsylvania Libertarian Party at the state convention on March 6, 2018.

Candidates

Nominee
 Dale Kerns, former Republican Eddystone Borough council member and board of directors member for Goodwill Industries

Green Party

Candidates

Nominee
 Neal Gale, Clean Energy Consultant

General election

Candidates
 Lou Barletta (R), U.S. Representative
 Bob Casey Jr. (D), incumbent senator
 Neal Gale (G), Clean Energy Consultant
 Dale Kerns (L), former Eddystone Borough council member

Predictions

Endorsements

Polling 

with Jim Christiana

with generic Democrat and Republican

Results

By congressional district
Bob Casey Jr won 11 of 18 congressional districts, including the 1st and 10th  districts, which elected Republicans to the House.

See also
 2018 United States Senate elections
 2018 United States House of Representatives elections in Pennsylvania
 2018 Pennsylvania gubernatorial election

References

External links
Candidates at Vote Smart
Candidates at Ballotpedia
Campaign finance at FEC
Campaign finance at OpenSecrets

Official campaign websites
 Lou Barletta (R) for Senate
 Bob Casey (D) for Senate
 Dale Kerns (L) for Senate
 Neal Gale (G) for Senate

2018
Pennsylvania
2018 Pennsylvania elections